The 2006–07 Danish 1st Division season was the 12th season of the Danish 1st Division league championship, governed by the Danish Football Association. It took place from the first match on July 29, 2006 to the final match on June 24, 2007.

The division-champion and runner-up were promoted to the 2007–08 Danish Superliga. The teams in the 14th, 15th and 16th places were divided between 2nd Division East and West, based on location.

League standings

See also
2006–07 in Danish football

References

Danish 1st Division seasons
Denmark
2006–07 in Danish football